Mohamad Radwan Kalaji (born 19 January 1992 in Aleppo, Syria) is a Syrian footballer. He currently plays for Al-Ittihad, which competes in the Syrian League the top division in Syria. He plays as a midfielder, wearing the number 14 jersey for Al-Ittihad. A product of Al-Ittihad's youth system, he made his first-team breakthrough under manager Valeriu Tița during the 2009–10 season.

He helped Al-Ittihad reach the final of the AFC Cup the second most important association cup in Asia. Al-Ittihad won the final against Kuwaiti Premier League champions Al-Qadsia after penalties. The game was tied 1–1 after regular time and Extra Time.

Kalaji was a part of the Syrian U-16 national team at the 2008 AFC U-16 Championship in Uzbekistan and he was a part of the Syrian U-19 national team at the 2010 AFC U-19 Championship in China, he scored one goal against Thailand in the first match of the group-stage.

Honour and Titles

Club 
Al-Ittihad
 Syrian Cup: 2011
 AFC Cup: 2010
Al-Muharraq
Bahraini King's Cup: 2013'''

References 

1992 births
Living people
Sportspeople from Aleppo
Syrian footballers
Association football midfielders
Al-Ittihad Aleppo players
Expatriate footballers in Bahrain
Syrian expatriate sportspeople in Bahrain
Syrian expatriate footballers
AFC Cup winning players
Syrian Premier League players